The Pound Ridge Golf Club is an 18-hole, public golf facility designed by World Golf Hall of Fame designer Pete Dye in Pound Ridge, New York. It features 7,165 yards of course from the back tees. It is Pete Dye's first and only design project in New York. The course was built at an estimated cost of $40 million by Kenneth Wang, brother of American fashion designer Vera Wang, and the current owner of the U.S. Summit Company. It was listed as the second best of Links Magazine's Best New Public Courses of 2008.

References

External links
 Official site

Golf clubs and courses designed by Pete Dye
Golf clubs and courses in New York (state)
Sports venues in Westchester County, New York
2008 establishments in New York (state)